New York State Wildlife Management Areas (WMAs) are conservation areas managed by the New York State Department of Environmental Conservation (NYSDEC) primarily for the benefit of wildlife, and used extensively by the public for hunting, fishing, and trapping. The Wildlife Management Areas program is administered by the Division of Fish, Wildlife and Marine Resources of the NYSDEC.

History
The first source of funding for New York's Wildlife Management Areas was the Conservation Fund of the Division, which was begun in 1925. It accumulates hunting, fishing, and trapping license fees and other miscellaneous fees and fines collected by the Division.  In the 1930s, the federal Resettlement Administration bought marginal and worn-out farmland and later donated it to the state for wildlife management purposes. The Pittman–Robertson Federal Aid in Wildlife Restoration Act of 1937 places an excise tax on guns and ammunition, of which 10% is returned to the states to fund restoration and management efforts for wildlife including purchase of habitat. New York State Bond Acts in 1960, 1972 and 1986 have also helped fund the WMA system.

Some of the WMAs occupy land that is environmentally sensitive. Thus the Lakeview Wildlife Management Area has been declared the Lakeview Marsh and Barrier Beach National Natural Landmark, and was cited in 1973 as, "One of the best and most extensive marshlands that lie in protected bays and behind barrier beaches along eastern Lake Ontario."

List of New York state wildlife management areas

See also
New York State Forests
List of National Wildlife Refuges in New York

References

Notes

Further reading
 Research paper NE-621.

External links
 NYS Department of Environmental Conservation: Wildlife Management Areas

 
Hunting in the United States
Recreational fishing in the United States
New York